Real Love Stories (stylized as Real. Love. Stories.) is the tenth album of singer/actress/host Jaya Ramsey. It is a 14-track covers album produced and released by GMA Records on August 23, 2009, both on CD and digital format.

It is also her second album under the said recording company. The first one was Cool Change which earned a gold record award for its outstanding sales.

Overview
Like its predecessor, Jaya's effort is a collection of cover songs composed of classic love ballads written and performed by international recording artists.

In this 14-track album, Jaya renders her own versions of carefully selected songs that tell stories of life, love, and all its other intricacies. Jaya wanted to sing some of her personal favorite songs. She cited two songs—"I Won't Last a Day Without You" and "All of My Life".

Track listing

Personnel
 Buddy C. Medina – executive producer
 Kedy Sanchez – supervising album producer
 Rene A. Salta – marketing
 Dominic Benedicto – engineer, recording, mixing
Nikki Cunanan – recording, mixing
Jeff Felix – recording, mixing

References

2004 albums
Jaya (singer) albums
GMA Music albums
Covers albums